The 2007 National Premier Soccer League season was the 5th season of the NPSL. The season started in May 2007, and ended with the NPSL Championship Game in August 2007.

Southern California Fusion finished the season as national champions, beating Queen City FC 1-0 in the NPSL Championship game in San Diego, CA.

Changes From 2006

New Franchises
Twelve franchises joined the league this year, all expansion franchises:

Folding
Eight teams left the league prior to the beginning of the season:
Chico Rooks - Chico, California
Detroit Arsenal - Berkley, Michigan
Grand Rapids Alliance - Grand Rapids, Michigan
Las Vegas Strikers - Las Vegas, Nevada
Minnesota NSC United - Blaine, Minnesota
Phoenix Banat Storm - Avondale, Arizona
Redwood City Ruckus - San Bruno, California
San Jose Frogs - San Jose, California -- left to join USL Premier Development League

Final standings
Purple indicates division title clinched

Northeast Division

Midwest Division

Southwest Division

Northwest Division

Playoffs

References
 US soccer history archives for 2007

2007
4